The  is an electric multiple unit (EMU) train type operated in Japan by the private railway operator Hankyu Railway since 1989.

Formations
As of 1 April 2012, the fleet consists of 84 vehicles formed as five 8-car sets, four 6+2-car sets, and two 6-car sets which normally run coupled with 2-car 7300 series sets.

8-car sets

 The "Mc1" and "M1" cars are each fitted with two scissors-type pantographs.
 The "Mc1" and "M1" cars of set 8315 are each fitted with two single-arm pantographs.
 Sets from 8303 onward have a modified front end design.

2+6-car sets

 The "Mc1" and "M1" cars are each fitted with two scissors-type pantographs.

2+6-car mixed 7300/8300 series sets

 The "Mc", "Mc1", and "M1" cars are each fitted with two scissors-type pantographs.

Interior
Passenger accommodation consists of longitudinal bench seating throughout.

References

Electric multiple units of Japan
8300 series
Train-related introductions in 1989
1500 V DC multiple units of Japan
Alna Koki rolling stock